Joseph Frank Fontana  (born January 13, 1950) is an Italian-born  Canadian politician. He was a Liberal member of the House of Commons of Canada from 1987 to 2006, and mayor of London, Ontario from 2010 until his 2014 convictions for fraud and forgery.

Life and career

Fontana was born in Cellara, Cosenza, Italy in 1950, and moved to Canada with his parents at the age of four.

He studied chemical engineering at the University of Waterloo, but left school after becoming the drummer in a rock band. He later moved to London and briefly returned to school at the University of Western Ontario, but left to work in real estate and the insurance industry.

He opposed the building of a federal prison in London and soon became involved in local politics. In 1976 he ran for city council, representing Ward 3, but lost; in 1978 he also lost the Liberal nomination for the federal riding of London-Middlesex, but was elected to London City Council later in the year and served there until 1988, sitting on London's Board of Control from 1985 to 1988.

As Member of Parliament

In 1988 he was elected to the House of Commons as a member of the opposition and served as Critic for Urban Affairs and Housing. He also formed the band "True Grit" with several Liberals including Roger Gallaway and future prime minister Jean Chrétien (who played trombone). He became the Ontario chair of the Liberal caucus and was involved in the Task Force on Via Rail and the Task Force on the Economy and Recession. In 1990 he supported Paul Martin's attempt to become leader of the Liberal Party.

He was re-elected in 1993 and became parliamentary secretary to the Minister of Transport, playing a key role in, among other things, the introduction of the National Airports Policy. From 1996 to 1999 he served a record three times as chair of the national Liberal caucus and in 1999 became chair of the Standing Committee on Citizenship and Immigration and the chair of the Southwestern Ontario Liberal caucus.

He served as Minister of Labour in Paul Martin's minority government until February 6, 2006, when Stephen Harper was sworn in as Prime Minister.

He was re-elected in 1997, 2000, 2004, and 2006. Appointed as the critic for Science and Research within the Liberal shadow cabinet, Mr. Fontana was strongly speculated to be considering a run for leader of the Liberal Party of Canada, though he ultimately did not seek the post, supporting Gerard Kennedy instead.

Election as mayor

On September 8, 2006, Fontana announced that he would run for mayor in London against mayor Anne Marie DeCicco-Best. On September 20, 2006, Fontana formally resigned his seat in the House of Commons in order to run for mayor. He was unsuccessful, losing badly to Mayor DeCicco-Best.

He subsequently announced he would run in the 2010 London mayoral election, again against DeCicco-Best. Fontana won the mayoralty in that election.

As a member of the Privy Council of Canada, Fontana automatically received the Queen Elizabeth II Diamond Jubilee Medal in 2012.

Criminal convictions

In October 2012, calls for Fontana's resignation as mayor were made amid allegations of misuse of government funds used to pay for his son's wedding. Some city councillors urged Fontana to step aside during the investigation.

On November 21, 2012, the London detachment of the Royal Canadian Mounted Police issued a press release announcing that Fontana had been charged with breach of trust by a public officer; fraud under $5,000; and uttering forged documents.

On November 22, 2012, Fontana offered to resign from the London Police Services Board and his resignation was formally accepted. Under municipal law governing Ontario, Police Services cannot allow an individual who is under investigation for a criminal offences to take part in any police function.  At the next meeting of council's Finance and Administrative Services Committee, its councillors asked that Fontanta step aside, voting by a 3–1 vote margin that he resign his council seat and duties as mayor, however the committee decision was not binding under the Municipal Act. A council motion asking Fontana to leave office pending resolution of his criminal charges lost by a vote, 8–5.

Fontana was found guilty of the charges by the Ontario Superior Court on June 13, 2014, and sentenced to serve 4 months under house arrest and 18 months on probation.

On June 16, 2014, Fontana announced he would be stepping down as mayor of London. He formally resigned on June 19, and was temporarily succeeded by Ward 3 city councillor Joe Swan as acting mayor until a council vote the following week selected Joni Baechler as his formal successor until the 2014 municipal election.

Electoral record
London mayoral election, 2010

London mayoral election, 2006

^ Conservative change is from combined Canadian Alliance and Progressive Conservative totals.

^ Canadian Alliance change is from Reform

See also
 List of University of Waterloo people

References

External links

1950 births
Italian emigrants to Canada
Liberal Party of Canada MPs
Members of the House of Commons of Canada from Ontario
Members of the King's Privy Council for Canada
University of Western Ontario alumni
Mayors of London, Ontario
Living people
People from the Province of Cosenza
Members of the 27th Canadian Ministry